Clodoaldo Silva (born 1 February 1979) is a Brazilian Paralympic swimmer. He competed at the 2000 Summer Paralympics in Sydney, winning three silver medals and one bronze. He competed again at the 2004 Summer Paralympics in Athens, where he set four world records, five Paralympic records, and won six gold medals and one silver. He also represented Brazil at the 2008, 2012 and 2016 Paralympics, and lit the Paralympic cauldron at the 2016 Summer Paralympics opening ceremony.

In 2005, he was given the Best Male Athlete award by the International Paralympic Committee, the Best Female Athlete award going to Japan's Mayumi Narita.

Silva has cerebral palsy, and took up swimming in 1996 as part of his rehabilitation. He is married and has a daughter Anita.

At the 2016 Summer Paralympics he took a silver medal in the Mixed 4x50m Freestyle Relay. His teammates were Daniel Dias, Edenia Garcia, Susana Ribeiro, Talisson Glock, Maiara Regina Perreira Barreto, Joana Maria Silva and Patricia Pereira dos Santos. Silva was also the final torchbearer and lit the cauldron during the opening ceremony.

References

Living people
Paralympic swimmers of Brazil
Swimmers at the 2000 Summer Paralympics
Swimmers at the 2004 Summer Paralympics
Swimmers at the 2008 Summer Paralympics
Swimmers at the 2012 Summer Paralympics
Swimmers at the 2016 Summer Paralympics
Paralympic gold medalists for Brazil
Paralympic silver medalists for Brazil
Paralympic bronze medalists for Brazil
1979 births
Medalists at the 2000 Summer Paralympics
Medalists at the 2004 Summer Paralympics
Medalists at the 2008 Summer Paralympics
Medalists at the 2016 Summer Paralympics
People from Natal, Rio Grande do Norte
Paralympic Sport Awards — Best Male winners
Medalists at the World Para Swimming Championships
Paralympic medalists in swimming
Medalists at the 2003 Parapan American Games
Medalists at the 2011 Parapan American Games
Medalists at the 2015 Parapan American Games
Brazilian male freestyle swimmers
Brazilian male medley swimmers
S5-classified Paralympic swimmers
Sportspeople from Rio Grande do Norte
20th-century Brazilian people
21st-century Brazilian people